Martínez is a town in the province of Ávila, Castile and León in Spain. It belongs in the judicial district of Piedrahita.

Situation
It is located at an altitude of 1098 m and covers an area of 17.20 km². Located 70 km from the capital, bordering the province of Salamanca. Belongs to the judicial district of Piedrahita.

Population
Data INE for 2005.

Total: 190
Male: 100
Female: 90

Government
The mayor is Adolfo Caselle White.

References

External links
 Official Website of Martínez

Populated places in the Province of Ávila